Dentalium zelandicum is a species of tusk shell, a marine scaphopod mollusk in the family Dentaliidae.

This species is endemic to New Zealand waters.

References

Scaphopods
Molluscs described in 1860